Barry Jensen is a former professional rugby league footballer in the New South Wales Rugby League (NSWRL) competition. Jensen was a member of the Newtown Jets and Illawarra Steelers rugby league teams and also represented his state. He is the first player to ever be sin binned in the N.S.W.R.L..

Jensen was selected to represent New South Wales as hooker for the only State of Origin game in 1981.

Jensen's rugby league career came to an end midway through 1982. He played his last game for Illawarra in round 18 and retired due to a neck injury.

References

1956 births
Living people
Australian rugby league players
New South Wales Rugby League State of Origin players
Newtown Jets players
Illawarra Steelers players
Rugby league hookers
Rugby league players from Sydney